The women's 4 x 100 metres relay at the 2010 African Championships in Athletics was held on July 30.

Results

External links
Results

Relay
Relays at the African Championships in Athletics
2010 in women's athletics